This is a list of French television related events from 1970.

Events
21 February - Guy Bonnet is selected to represent France at the 1970 Eurovision Song Contest with his song "Marie-Blanche". He is selected to be the fifteenth French Eurovision entry during a national final.

Debuts
19 May - Aujourd'hui Madame (1970-1982)

Television shows

1940s
Le Jour du Seigneur (1949–present)

1950s
Discorama
La Piste aux étoiles (1956-1978)
Présence protestante (1955-)

1960s
Dim Dam Dom (1965-1971)
La Tête et les Jambes (1960-1978)
La Caméra invisible (1964-1971)
Les Coulisses de l'exploit (1961-1972)
Les Dossiers de l'écran (1967-1991)
Monsieur Cinéma (1967-1980)
Colorix (1967-1973)
Les Animaux du monde (1969-1990)
Alain Decaux raconte (1969-1987)
Télé-Philatélie

Ending this year
Magazine féminin (1952-1970)

Births
28 March - Benjamin Castaldi, television personality
30 December - Sandrine Quétier, television presenter

Deaths

See also
1970 in France
List of French films of 1970